The Bay of Santander is both a comarca of Cantabria and the largest estuary on the North coast of Spain, with an extension of 22.42 km (9 km long and 5 km wide). Due to the influence of Santander and its metropolitan area, nearly half of the population of the autonomous community of Cantabria is gathered around it, which makes the anthropic pressure on this area of water quite notable.

The entrance to the bay is lined by the Sardinero beaches, where the Isle of Mouro with its lighthouse can be found. The access to its interior is through a narrow channel of water between the Magdalena Peninsula, near to which are the Isle of the Tower and Horadada Island; and the sandbanks of the El Puntal, a long series of beaches and dunes that protect the tranquil inner waters of the bay.

The morphology of the bay has suffered important changes in the last centuries. It is estimated that more than 50% of the original extension has been filled up, drying up a large amount of marsh area for grasslands, to expand the Port of Santander, and to create new industrial and residential areas. At the moment, work is going on to recover the seaside ecosystem in some areas of high ecological value.

Municipalities

The municipalities within the administrative comarca are as follows, listed below with their areas and populations:

Rivers and rias

Several rivers empty into the Bay of Santander. The most important is the Ria de Solía, in the South. The Ria de San Salvador empties in the center of the Bay via the Ria de Astillero while in the East flow the Rias of Carmen and Raos; to the West is the Ria de Cubas, which is the mouth of the Miera River.

Geology
The Santander Bay is formed by a diapir generated during the alpinotype orogeny of the Tertiary period. Its materials are composed of clays and salts (specially Keuper's gypsums) that ascended taking advantage of the faults. This movement generated an increase of the fracturing and an important dragging of rocks from the outer layers. The weakness zone generated by the Keuper's clays made easier its erosion compared with other sandstone or limestone areas, which involved the advance of the sea and the formation of the bay.

Flora and fauna
Common Tern (Sterna hirundo)

References

External links
Live webcam of Santander Bay
High resolution live camera of the Bay
Pictures of Santander and Cantabria, including Santander's bay
 Report about the refill process of the Bay of Santander

Santander Bay
Santander
Green Spain
Santander, Spain